Bouloc-en-Quercy (literally Bouloc in Quercy; before 2017: Bouloc; Languedocien: Bonlòc) is a commune in the Tarn-et-Garonne department in the Occitanie region in southern France.

Geography
The Séoune forms parts of the commune's western border. The Barguelonnette forms parts of the commune's southern border.

See also
Communes of the Tarn-et-Garonne department

References

Communes of Tarn-et-Garonne